Danny Fury (born in Basel) is a Swiss drummer and singer. Fury has been a member of Rogue Male, The Lords of the New Church, Kill City Dragons, Vain, The Dogs D'Amour and Sham 69.

After playing in several bands and touring Switzerland, France and Germany, as well as working as a session drummer at Musicland Studios in Munich. Fury moved to London in 1984. as of 2011 Danny Formed and became the vocalist of the Tango Pirates. now also Known as "Danny Fury's Tango Pirates".

Discography
With Rogue Male
Animal Man (1986)

With Lords of the New Church
Second Coming (1989)
Making Time (1989)
The Lords Prayers (2002)
The Gospel Truth (2012)

With Kill City Dragons
Let 'em eat Cake (1990)
Kill City Dragons (1990)

With Vain
Move on it (1994)

With Wild at Heart
Chasing The Dragon (2007)

With Sham 69
Set List, The Anthology (2013)

With The DeRellas
Slam Bam (2014)

With Dirty Strangers...with Brian James
T'Troublemaker / S.B.C.L. (2017)

With (Danny Fury's) Tango Pirates
Back on Track (2012)
In Transition (2014)
Danger! Children at Play (2015)

References

External links 

Year of birth missing (living people)
Living people
Swiss drummers
Swiss male musicians
Male drummers
Swiss male singers
The Lords of the New Church members